Khiaran (also Romanized as Khīārān; also known as Khīārān-e Khānī and Nūr‘alī-ye Khīārān-e Far‘ī) is a village in Kunani Rural District, Kunani District, Kuhdasht County, Lorestan Province, Iran. At the 2006 census, its population was 45, in 9 families.

References 

Towns and villages in Kuhdasht County